The 2015 São Tomé (Island or Regional) Second Division was a third-tier competition that took place that season.  The club had 10 clubs, the competition began on 9 May and finished on 28 October. Geographically almost all clubs but Porto Alegre and Ribeira Peixe were from the north. Agrosport won the title and participated in the Premier Division in the following season, as the number of clubs in that division had risen to 12, four clubs qualified alongside Trindade, Inter Bom Bom and Ké Morabeza (formerly Boa Vista). A total of 90 matches were played and 252 goals were scored.

On the opposites, both Ribeira Peixe and Porto Alegre were relegated into the Third Division in the following season as they were the last placed clubs.

Overview
Agrosport scored the most goals numbering 39, second was Trindade FC with 38 and third was Inter Bom Bom with 33. Ribeira Peixe scored the least with ten. On the opposites, Juba Diogo Simão conceded the most with 55, second was Oque d'El Rei with 33 and third was Ribeira Peixe with 30.

In the following season, four clubs would be promoted as the Third Division would be reduced to 10 teams. Palmar, Boavista Uba Bodo, Sporting São Tomé and Ototó were promoted.

Teams

The second division featured 10 clubs.

Division table

References

Football competitions in São Tomé and Príncipe
Sao Tome
Sao Tome Second Division